In comparative mythology, sky father is a term for a recurring concept in polytheistic religions of a sky god who is addressed as a "father", often the father of a pantheon and is often either a reigning or former King of the Gods. The concept of "sky father" may also be taken to include Sun gods with similar characteristics, such as Ra. The concept is complementary to an "earth mother".

"Sky Father" is a direct translation of the Vedic Dyaus Pita, etymologically descended from the same Proto-Indo-European deity name as the Greek Zeûs Pater and Roman Jupiter and Germanic Týr, Tir or Tiwaz, all of which are reflexes of the same Proto-Indo-European deity's name, *Dyēus Ph₂tḗr. While there are numerous parallels adduced from outside of Indo-European mythology, there are exceptions (e.g. In Egyptian mythology, Nut is the sky mother and Geb is the earth father).

In historical religion

See also
Astrotheology
Earth mother
God in Abrahamic religions
Sky deity
Thunder god

References 

Father
Comparative mythology
Mythological archetypes